The Trà Bồng River is a river of Vietnam. It flows through Quảng Ngãi Province for 70 kilometres.

References

Rivers of Quảng Ngãi province
Rivers of Vietnam